A liquid crystal rear projection television system using a patented "optical engine" made by Sony to provide a large image in a very compact chassis.  Screen sizes in inches  can range anywhere for 42" to 70"; with exceptional sharpness, composed of approximately 2.5 million plus pixels.

References

Sony products